Scolizona rhinoceros is a moth in the family Lecithoceridae. It is found in Papua province (once called Irian Jaya) of Indonesia.

The wingspan is 19–21 mm.

References

Moths described in 1954
Lecithocerinae
Taxa named by Alexey Diakonoff